

Helmut Reichelt (born 1939, in Borås) is a German Marxian critic of political economy, sociologist and philosopher. Reichelt is one of the main authors of the “Neue Marx-Lektüre” (new Marx reading) and considered to be one of the most important theorists in the field of Marx's theory of value.

He studied economics, sociology and philosophy in Frankfurt where Theodor W. Adorno supervised his diploma in 1968. In 1970 Reichelt obtained his Ph.D at the Institute for Social Research. In 1971 he became professor of sociology at the Johann Wolfgang Goethe University Frankfurt am Main. One year later he was also appointed as the dean of the philosophy department in Frankfurt.

On the initiative of Alfred Sohn-Rethel Reichelt accepted the Professorship for social theory at the department of Sociology at the University of Bremen in 1978. He remained in Bremen until his retirement in 2005.

Reichelt's research interests are the theory of society with special emphasis on the problems of the theory of economic value. Already during his time as a university student he began a long-term cooperation with Hans-Georg Backhaus. Together with Backhaus he considered engaging with economic phenomena and economic theory as fundamental for critical theory. Since 1998 Reichelt and Backhaus contributions have spawned a rich debate on theories of economic value and its relation to critical theory. Reichelt has published widely on Marx, on Adorno's social theory and on economic theory. Reichelt also oversaw an edition of Hegel's Philosophy of Right in the Ullstein Verlag. He is the current chair of the German Marx-Society.

Selected publications

Main work
 Reichelt, Helmut: Neue Marx Lektuere - Zur Kritik sozialwissenschaftlicher Logik. Hamburg 2008.
 Reichelt, Helmut: Zur logischen Struktur des Kapitalbegriffs bei Karl Marx. Freiburg 2001.

Further publications

 Der Zusammenhang von Werttheorie und ökonomischen Kategorien bei Marx, 1999 - online
 Die Marxsche Kritik ökonomischer Kategorien. Überlegungen zum Problem der Geltung in der dialektischen Darstellungsmethode im „Kapital“, 2001 - PDF 
 Einige Fragen und Anmerkungen zu Nadjas „Kritik als Substanz des Denkens bei Kant und Marx.“, 2005 - PDF 
  Marx's Critique of Economic Categories: Reflections on the Problem of Validity in the Dialectical Method of Presentation in Capital, in: Historical Materialism, Volume 15, Number 4, 2007, pp. 3–52(50) - abstract

References

Further reading
 Eldred, Michael Critique of competitive freedom and the bourgeois-democratic state. Copenhagen: Kurasje, 1984 .
 Kerr, Derek: The Politics of Change: Globalisation, Ideology and Critique..
 Kirchhoff, Christine / Pahl, Hanno / Engemann, Christoph / Heckel, Judith / Meyer, Lars (eds.): Gesellschaft als Verkehrung. Perspektiven einer neuen Marx-Lektüre. Festschrift für Helmut Reichelt, Freiburg 2004, .
 Kubota, Ken: Die dialektische Darstellung des allgemeinen Begriffs des Kapitals im Lichte der Philosophie Hegels. Zur logischen Analyse der politischen Ökonomie unter besonderer Berücksichtigung Adornos und der Forschungsergebnisse von Rubin, Backhaus, Reichelt, Uno und Sekine (PDF), in: Beiträge zur Marx-Engels-Forschung. Neue Folge 2009, pp. 199–224. .
 Kubota, Ken: The Dialectical Presentation of the General Notion of Capital in the Light of Hegel's Philosophy: On the Logical Analysis of Political Economy with Special Consideration of Adorno and the Research Results of Rubin, Backhaus, Reichelt, Uno, and Sekine (PDF), in: Revista Dialectus 9 (2020), no. 18, pp. 39–65. .
 Meyer, Lars: Absoluter Wert und allgemeiner Wille. Zur Selbstbegründung dialektischer Gesellschaftstheorie, Bielefeld 2005, .
 Pahl, Hanno, Lars Meyer: Kognitiver Kapitalismus: Soziologische Beiträge zur Theorie der Wissensökonomie, Marburg 2007, 
 Pahl, Hanno: Das Geld in der modernen Wirtschaft. Marx und Luhmann im Vergleich, Frankfurt 2008,

External links
 Verified, continuously updated selected bibliography with links and materials.

1939 births
Living people
Marxian economists
Marxist theorists
German economists
German philosophers
German Marxists
German male writers
Marxian critique of political economy
Critics of political economy